John Hubert Peschges (May 11, 1881 – October 30, 1944) was a prelate of the Roman Catholic Church.  He served as the second bishop of the Diocese of Crookston in Minnesota from 1938 until his death in 1944.

Biography 
John Peschges was born in West Newton, Minnesota on May 11, 1881. He was ordained a priest by Bishop Joseph Cotter for the Diocese of Winona on April 15, 1905. 

On August 30, 1938, Pope Pius XI appointed Peschges bishop of the Crookston Diocese; he was consecrated by Bishop Francis Kelly on November 9, 1938. Peschges established the Confraternity of Christian Doctrine, religious courses for rural youth, and multiple organizations for agricultural development.

John Peschges died in Crookston on October 30, 1944.

References

1881 births
1944 deaths
People from Nicollet County, Minnesota
20th-century Roman Catholic bishops in the United States
Roman Catholic bishops of Crookston